La Gazette de Berlin is the French-language newspaper published and circulated in Germany each month. Published by Régis Présent-Griot, the target audience are the 400,000 francophones in Germany. The first edition was issued on 1 June 2006.

One page is in German, and the editorial office is in Prenzlauer Berg, Berlin.

The newspaper's name and masthead (a crowned eagle holding a sheet of paper and a pen) are borrowed from the original La Gazette de Berlin, founded in 1743.

La Gazette de Berlin is distributed and sold in Berlin, Hamburg, Munich, Frankfurt am Main, Cologne, Düsseldorf and Bonn and in several other cities all over Germany.

See also
French day schools in Germany:
 Französisches Gymnasium Berlin
 École de Gaulle-Adenauer (Bonn)
 Lycée français de Düsseldorf
 Lycée français Victor Hugo (Frankfurt)
 Lycée Antoine-de-Saint-Exupéry de Hambourg (Hamburg)
 Lycée Jean Renoir (Munich)
French-German schools:
 Deutsch-Französisches Gymnasium Freiburg im Breisgau
 Deutsch-Französisches Gymnasium Saarbrücken

External links
 Official site

Newspapers published in Berlin
French-language newspapers published in Europe
Publications established in 2006